Novy Bishaul (Yañı Bişawıl) is a rural locality (a village) in Starobabichevsky Selsoviet, Karmaskalinsky District, Bashkortostan, Russia. The population was 73 as of 2010. There is 1 street.

Geography 
Novy Bishaul is located 28 km south of Karmaskaly (the district's administrative centre) by road. Lipovka is the nearest rural locality.

References 

Rural localities in Karmaskalinsky District